Common names: red-spotted earth snake.
Uropeltis rubromaculata is a species of nonvenomous shieldtail snake in the family Uropeltidae. The species is endemic to southern India. There are no subspecies that are recognized as being valid.

Geographic range
U. rubromaculata is found in southern India in the Western Ghats in the Anaimalai Hills and Nilgiri Hills between  elevation.

The type locality given is "Anamallay forests; 4,000 feet elevation" (1,200 m).

Habitat

Description
The dorsum of U. rubromaculata is olive-brown. There are some red blotches on each side of the anterior portion of the body, and one red blotch on each side of the tail near the vent. The venter is variegated with yellow and red.

Adults may attain  in total length (including tail).

The dorsal scales are arranged in 17 rows at midbody, in 19 rows behind the head. The ventrals number 127–136, and the subcaudals number 8–10.

The snout is obtuse. The rostral is slightly more than ¼ the length of the shielded part of the head. The portion of the rostral visible from above is as long as its distance from the frontal. The nasals are in contact with each other behind the rostral. The frontal is slightly longer than broad. The diameter of the eye is ½ or slightly more than ½ the length of the ocular shield. The diameter of body goes 25 to 33 times into the total length. The ventrals are two times as broad as the contiguous scales. The end of the tail is flat dorsally, obliquely truncate, with strongly bicarinate or tricarinate scales. The terminal scute has a transverse ridge and two points.

Behaviour
U. rubromaculata is terrestrial and fossorial.

Reproduction
U. rubromaculata is ovoviviparous.

References

Further reading

Beddome, R.H. (1867). "Descriptions and figures of Five New Snakes from the Madras Presidency". Madras Quarterly Journal of Medical Science 11: 14-16 + Plates I–II. [Reprint: J. Soc. Bibliogr. Nat. Sci., London 1 (10): 315- 317, 1940.] (Silybura rubro-maculata, new species, p. 15 + Plate 2, figure 3 [four views]).
Beddome, R.H. (1886). "An Account of the Earth-Snakes of the Peninsula of India and Ceylon". Annals and Magazine of Natural History, Fifth Series 17: 3-33. (Silybura rubromaculata, p. 14).
Boulenger, G.A. (1890). The Fauna of British India, Including Ceylon and Burma. Reptilia and Batrachia. London: Secretary of State for India in Council. (Taylor and Francis, printers). xviii + 541 pp. (Silybura rubromaculata, p. 268).
Sharma, R.C. (2003). Handbook: Indian Snakes. Kolkata: Zoological Survey of India. 292 pp. .
Smith, M.A. (1943). The Fauna of British India, Ceylon and Burma, Including the Whole of the Indo-Chinese Sub-region. Reptilia and Amphibia. Vol. III.—Serpentes. London: Secretary of State for India. (Taylor and Francis, printers). xii + 583 pp. (Uropeltis rubromaculatus, new combination, pp. 81–82).

External links

Uropeltidae
Reptiles of India
Endemic fauna of the Western Ghats
Reptiles described in 1867
Taxa named by Richard Henry Beddome